Felicjan Szczesny Kowarski (8 November 1890 – 22 September 1948) was a Polish painter and sculptor, known mostly from his monumental wall paintings and plafonds (e.g. plafond in the Hall under the Birds at castle of Wawel). His work was part of the painting event in the art competition at the 1936 Summer Olympics.

See also
 Jan Betley

References

External links
Felicjan Kowarski's gallery at malarze.com

1890 births
1948 deaths
20th-century Polish painters
20th-century Polish male artists
Polish sculptors
Polish male sculptors
20th-century sculptors
Olympic competitors in art competitions
Polish male painters